The Patrick Farrish House, also known as the Lowe and Paula McDaniel House, is a historic house located in Thomaston, Alabama. It was built in 1926 in the Craftsman style.  The house was added to the National Register of Historic Places on August 31, 2000, due to its architectural significance.

References

National Register of Historic Places in Marengo County, Alabama
Houses on the National Register of Historic Places in Alabama
Houses completed in 1926
American Craftsman architecture in Alabama
Bungalow architecture in Alabama
Houses in Marengo County, Alabama